S/2021 J 3 is a small outer natural satellite of Jupiter discovered by Scott S. Sheppard on 12 August 2021, using the 6.5-meter Magellan-Baade Telescope at Las Campanas Observatory, Chile. It was announced by the Minor Planet Center on 19 January 2023, after observations were collected over a long enough time span to confirm the satellite's orbit.

References 

Ananke group
Moons of Jupiter
Irregular satellites
20210812
Discoveries by Scott S. Sheppard
Moons with a retrograde orbit